The Concerto in A minor for Oboe and Strings was written by Ralph Vaughan Williams in 1943–44 for the oboist Léon Goossens, to whom the score is dedicated.

History
Vaughan Williams began work on the Oboe Concerto in 1943, immediately after completing the Fifth Symphony, with which it shares a great deal. Amongst other things, the concerto began as a revision of a scherzo movement originally intended for the symphony. The concerto was to have been premiered at a Proms concert on 5 July 1944, but due to the threat of V1 rocket raids on London the Proms season was curtailed. The piece was first played in Liverpool instead, on 30 September 1944 in a concert by the Liverpool Philharmonic, conducted by Malcolm Sargent, that also included the Oboe Concerto by the soloist's brother, Eugène Goossens.

Analysis
This pastoral piece is divided into three movements:
 Rondo Pastorale (Allegro moderato)
 Minuet and Musette (Allegro moderato)
 Scherzo (Presto – Doppio più lento – Lento – Presto)

The concerto has an element of cyclic form. Each movement begins and ends with the same pentatonic theme, spanning an octave. It is scored for a solo oboe and strings.

References

Sources

Further reading

 Campbell Bailey, Mary Lindsey. 2010. "Léon Goossens's Impact on Twentieth-Century English Oboe Repertoire: Phantasy Quartet of Benjamin Britten, Concerto for Oboe and Strings of Ralph Vaughan Williams, and Sonata for Oboe of York Bowen." DMA diss. Cincinnati: University of Cincinnati.
 Day, James. 1998. Vaughan Williams, completely overhauled [third] edition. Oxford and New York: Oxford University Press.  (cloth);  (pbk).
 Dickinson, A. E. F. 1963. Vaughan Williams. London: Faber and Faber. .
 Friesenhagen, Andreas. 1992. "Das Oboenkonzert von Ralph Vaughan Williams: Anmerkungen zu Form und Thematik". Das Orchester: Zeitschrift für Orchesterkultur und Rundfunk-Chorwesen 40, no. 11:1293–1297.
 Holmes, Paul. 1997. Vaughan Williams: His Life and Times. London: Omnibus Press. .
 Howes, Frank. 1975. The Music of Ralph Vaughan Williams. Westport, Connecticut: Greenwood Press Publishers.
 Kennedy, Michael. 1964. The Works of Ralph Vaughan Williams. London and New York: Oxford University Press.
 Kennedy, Michael. 1996. A Catalogue of the Works of Ralph Vaughan Williams, second edition. Oxford and New York: Oxford University Press. .
 Kupitz, Emily. 2013. "English Folk Song Influences on the Vaughan Williams Concerto for Oboe and Strings." DMA diss. Tempe: Arizona State University.
 Rosen, Carole. 1993. The Goossens: A Musical Century. London: André Deutsch.

External links
 
 
 Program notes by Jason Sundram
 Program notes by David Hoose (archive from 20 March 2012, accessed 28 April 2016)
 , Albrecht Mayer (oboe), Daniel Stabrawa conducting

Concertos by Ralph Vaughan Williams
Vaughan Williams
1944 compositions
Compositions in A minor
Music dedicated to ensembles or performers